Yoro may refer to:

Places
Yoro, Mali, a village, and the seat of the Cercle of Koro in the Mopti Region
Yoro (crater), a crater on Mars

Honduras
Yoro, the capital city of Yoro Department, Honduras
Yoro Department, a department of Honduras
Roman Catholic Diocese of Yoro, Honduras

Japan
Yōrō, Gifu, Japan; a town in Yoro District of Gifu
Yōrō District, Gifu, Japan; a district of Gifu Prefecture
Yōrō Mountains, a mountain range between Mie and Gifu prefectures of Japan
Mount Yōrō, Gifu Prefecture, Japan; the central peak of the Yōrō Mountains
Yōrō Falls, a waterfall in Yoro District, Gifu Prefecture, Japan
Yōrō River, a small river in Chiba Prefecture, Japan

Facilities and structures

Japan
 Yōrō Line, a rail line of the Yōrō Railway over the Yōrō Mountains in Japan
 Yōrō Station, Yoro, Yoro, Gifu, Japan; a rail station
 Yōrō Shrine, Yoro Town, Yoro District, Gifu, Japan; a Shinto shrine

Honduras
 Yoro Airport (IATA airport code: ORO, ICAO airport code: MHYR), Yoro Department, Honduras
 Montaña de Yoro National Park, Honduras

People
 Bishop of Yoro, of the Honduran bishopric Roman Catholic Diocese of Yoro
 Jacob Yoro (born 1979) U.S. American football coach
 Yoro Dyao (1847-1919) a Wolof noble of Senegal
 Yoro Diakité (1932-1973) a Malian politician
 Yoro Lamine Ly (born 1988), a Senegalese soccer player

Other uses
Yōrō, a Japanese era
Yōrō Railway, a rail company in Japan
Yoro F.C., a soccer team in Yoro, Honduras

See also

 Yōrō Code, a code of laws in Nara-era Japan